Maglev is a form of rail transport using magnetic levitation.

Maglev may also refer to:

 Magnetic levitation, a method by which an object is suspended using magnetic fields
 MagLev (software), an implementation of the Ruby programming language